John Jenkins  (1755–1822) was an American schoolteacher who wrote the first entirely American book on penmanship, The Art of Writing, Reduced to a Plain and Easy System, first printed in 1791 by Isaiah Thomas. It consisted of 32 pages of text, four plates of engraved writing samples and a frontispiece. It was recommended by John Adams, Benjamin Franklin and John Hancock. Jenkins' system became the standard in America, and a revised second edition was published in 1813 by Flagg & Gould.

See also
 Platt Rogers Spencer, who created a later writing system

References

External links
 Complete text of The Art of Writing (1813) at the Internet Archive

1755 births
1822 deaths
18th-century American non-fiction writers
Penmanship